Robert G. Clarke (born March 2, 1967) is a politician and career Royal Canadian Mounted Police officer. He was the Conservative Party of Canada's candidate in Desnethé—Missinippi—Churchill River for the March 17, 2008 federal by-election in which he defeated Liberal candidate Joan Beatty.

A member of the Muskeg Lake First Nation, he grew up in Gibsons, Slocan, and Quesnel, British Columbia. At the time of his election to the House of Commons of Canada he had been a member of the RCMP for 18 years, all of which was spent in Saskatchewan, and has attained the rank of sergeant.

Clarke sponsored the Indian Act Amendment and Replacement Act as a private members bill. The bill became law in December 2014.

In the 2015 Canadian Election, Clarke finished third and was defeated by NDP candidate Georgina Jolibois by 1,190 votes.

Electoral record 

|-

References

External links
Official Website

1967 births
Living people
First Nations politicians
Conservative Party of Canada MPs
Members of the House of Commons of Canada from Saskatchewan
Royal Canadian Mounted Police officers
People from Kitimat
Indigenous Members of the House of Commons of Canada
21st-century Canadian politicians
Cree people